Taha Muhie-eldin Marouf (1924 – 7 August 2009) was an Iraqi politician and served as the vice president of Iraq from 1974 until the U.S. invasion in April 2003.

Early life
He was born in 1924 in Sulaymaniyah, into a prominent family in Kurd-dominated northern Iraq.

Political life
Marouf joined the Arab Socialist Ba'ath Party in 1968 and held several ministerial posts.

Marouf was an ethnic Kurd in Saddam Hussein's Ba'ath Party hierarchy, but the Kurdish community viewed his appointment  as a mere gesture, believing that he had little real power. However, he did serve as ambassador to Italy, Malta, and Albania.

It was announced that Marouf was taken into custody on 2 May 2003. He had been captured with two other Saddam deputies Abd al-Tawab Mullah Huwaysh, director of the Office of Military Industrialization and a deputy prime minister in charge of arms procurement, and Mizban Khadr Hadi commander of one of four military regions Saddam established on the eve of the 2003 invasion of Iraq. Marouf was #24 (initially #42) on the U.S. list of most-wanted Iraqis. He was represented by the nine of diamonds in the Most-wanted Iraqi playing cards.

He died on 7 August 2009 in Amman, Jordan. He was buried in Erbil, Iraq, the following day.

References

1924 births
2009 deaths
Vice presidents of Iraq
Year of birth uncertain
Iraqi Kurdistani politicians
Iraqi Kurdish people
Government ministers of Iraq
Arab Socialist Ba'ath Party – Iraq Region politicians
Prisoners and detainees of the United States military
Ambassadors of Iraq to Italy
People from Sulaymaniyah
Heads of government who were later imprisoned
Most-wanted Iraqi playing cards
Iraq War prisoners of war
Iraqi prisoners of war